Evening Post or The Evening Post may refer to the following newspapers:

United Kingdom
 Evening Post (London) (1710–1732), then Berington's Evening Post (1732–1740) 
 London Evening Post (1727–1797)
 Whitehall Evening Post (1718–1801), London
 Bristol Evening Post (1932–2012), renamed the Bristol Post
 Jersey Evening Post (founded 1890)
 Lancashire Evening Post (founded 1886)
 Nottingham Evening Post (founded 1878), now the Nottingham Post
 Reading Evening Post, name changed to the Reading Post in 2009
 South Wales Evening Post, name changed in 1932 from the original South Wales Daily Post
 Wigan Evening Post, formerly Wigan Evening Post and Chronicle, now Wigan Post
 Yorkshire Evening Post (founded 1890), Leeds, West Yorkshire

United States
 Boston Evening-Post (1735–1775)
 The Evening Post (1894–1991), now part of The Post and Courier, Charleston, South Carolina
 Chicago Evening Post (1865–1875) - see Newspapers of the Chicago metropolitan area
 Chicago Evening Post (1886–1932)
 Evening Post (1892–1893), then the Denver Evening Post (1895–1900), now The Denver Post
 Memphis Evening Post (1868–1869), last name of the Memphis Post
 New-York Evening Post (1801–1934), now the New York Post
 The (Cincinnati) Evening Post (1883–1890), later The Cincinnati Post
 The (Louisville) Evening Post, which was merged with the Louisville Herald to become the Louisville Herald-Post.

Elsewhere
 The Evening Post (New Zealand) (1865–2002)
 Independence Evening Post, Taiwan (1947–2001)
 Regina Evening Post, merged with The Leader to form the Leader-Post, Regina, Saskatchewan, Canada
 Yangtse Evening Post, China
 , South Africa

See also
 The Saturday Evening Post, an American magazine
 Shanghai Evening Post & Mercury, a defunct Chinese newspaper
 New Evening Post (1950–1997), Hong Kong
 Aftenposten (Norwegian for The Evening Post), Norway's largest newspaper
 Goulburn Evening Penny Post (1870–1957), Goulburn, New South Wales, Australia
 The Post (disambiguation)